The Woman Worth Millions (German: Die Frau mit den Millionen) is a 1923 German silent film directed by Willi Wolff and starring Ellen Richter, Georg Alexander and Hugo Flink. It was released in three separate parts.

Cast

References

External links

Films of the Weimar Republic
Films directed by Willi Wolff
German silent feature films
UFA GmbH films
German black-and-white films